Turismo Carretera (Road racing, lit., Road Touring) is a popular stock car racing series in Argentina, and the oldest auto racing series still active in the world. The series is organized by Asociación Corredores de Turismo Carretera.

History
The first TC competition took place in 1937 with 12 races, each in a different province. Future Formula One star Juan Manuel Fangio (Chevrolet) won the 1940 and 1941 editions of the TC. It was during this time that the series' Chevrolet-Ford rivalry began, with Ford acquiring most of its historical victories.

Until the 1960s the races were held on temporarily closed roads, hence the series' name. These improvised circuits would often present a combination of dirt and asphalt surfaces unlike those of dedicated race tracks.

During the 1960s the category began employing high-end technologies, with local manufacturers investing heavily for prestige. Ford Motor Argentina and Chevrolet were main contenders, with Dodge to a lesser degree. The European brand Renault, which had merged with Industrias Kaiser Argentina and thus inherited the Rambler range, was also a contender.

In the 1970s, the Sport Prototipo (modified cars in the Gran Turismo vein) category was spun off TC to allow TC to return to its stock-car roots which made it immensely popular with small-town audiences. The spin-off withered away slowly. A second spin-off was TC 2000 Championship in the 1980s which allowed the showcasing of the smaller cars most Argentines were driving, thus including Peugeot, Renault, Fiat and Volkswagen, and later, Japanese brands as well. TC 2000 soon became as popular as TC itself.

In later years, and to preserve its main draw, TC has been clinging to the larger models that have mostly gone out of use in Argentine roads, and incorporated imported engines.

Brands in TC still have huge fan bases, with Ford and Chevrolet being the largest. General Motors decided to end manufacturing Chevy Coupé SS (Chevrolet Nova) in Argentina in 1977. Dodge and IKA-Torino are the other two participants with wins in TC.

Pyramid
There are currently four tiers on the Turismo Carretera ladder. The top rung is Turismo Carretera itself, followed by TC Pista as the second division (established in 1995), TC Mouras as the third division (established in 2004 and named after driver Roberto Mouras) and TC Pista Mouras as the fourth division (established in 2008). Pista Mouras is considered the first step for drivers from regional race series to compete nationally.

A fifth category, TC Pick Up, was introduced in 2017 as an alternative to the third and fourth rungs on the ladder whilst creating a platform for manufacturers to advertise their light commercial trucks.

Gallery

Circuits
The circuits used in 2021:

Autódromo Roberto Mouras (Buenos Aires Province)
Autódromo Oscar y Juan Gálvez (Buenos Aires city)
Autódromo San Nicolás Ciudad (Buenos Aires Province)
Autódromo de Concepción del Uruguay (Entre Ríos Province)
Autódromo Ciudad de Paraná (Entre Ríos Province)
Autódromo Ciudad de Concordia (Entre Ríos Province)
Circuito San Juan Villicum (San Juan Province)
Autódromo Rosamonte (Misiones Province)
Autódromo Ciudad de Rafaela (Santa Fe Province)
Autódromo Rosendo Hernández (San Luis Province)
Autódromo Ciudad de Viedma (Río Negro Province)
Autódromo Provincia de La Pampa (La Pampa Province)

Active cars
Ford Falcon (42 titles)
Chevy Coupé SS (22 titles)
Dodge Polara GTX coupé (currently powered by a Chrysler Cherokee engine) (10 titles)
IKA-Renault Torino (currently powered by a Chrysler Cherokee engine) (5 titles)
Toyota Camry (since 2022)

Both Dodge and Torino were equipped with Chrysler Cherokee engines after 1995. Back when they won the titles they were equipped with their original engines. (a Dodge "Slant Six" engine for Dodge and a Tornado engine for the Torino).

Champions

Other active drivers 
 Juan Pablo Gianini
 Julián Santero
 Gabriel Ponce de León
 Gastón Mazzacane
 Facundo Ardusso
 Camilo Echevarría
 Leonel Pernía
 Emiliano Spataro
 Camilo Echevarría

References

External links
  Official site
  Information & History 
  History 
  Statistics, games, wallpapers

 
Recurring sporting events established in 1937